Operation Product was a Dutch military offensive against areas of Java and Sumatra controlled by the Republic of Indonesia during the Indonesian National Revolution. It took place between 21 July and 4 August 1947. Referred to by the Dutch as the first (of two) "". In Indonesia, the military offensive is more commonly known in Indonesian history books and military records as Agresi Militer Belanda I (Dutch Military Aggression I).

The offensive was launched in violation of the Linggadjati Agreement between the Republic and the Netherlands. The offensive resulted in the Dutch reducing Republican-held areas to smaller areas of Java and Sumatra, split by Dutch-held areas.

Background
Following Dutch assertions that Indonesia cooperated insufficiently in the implementation of the Linggadjati Agreement, which had been ratified on 25 March 1947 by the lower chamber of the Dutch parliament, this police action was also influenced by a Dutch perception that the Republic had failed to curb the influence of Indonesian Chinese, Indonesian Indians and the rising Indonesian Communist Party.

The 100,000 inactive Dutch soldiers in Java was a significant financial burden on the Netherlands after the ravages of World War II. By May 1947, the Dutch had decided they needed to directly attack the Republic to access commodities in Republican-held areas, in particular sugar in Java and oil and rubber in Sumatra. The Dutch military estimated they would need two weeks to secure Republican-held cities and six months for the whole of the Republican territory. The offensive was intended to not include an attack on Yogyakarta, seat of the Republican government, due to high expected costs of fighting there.

Offensive
On 21 July, the Dutch deployed three divisions in Java and three brigades in less-densely populated Sumatra. The operation resulted in the occupation of large parts of Java and Sumatra, with the Republican army (TNI) offering only weak resistance, mostly withdrew to avoid frontal combat preferring guerilla tactics and scorched earth tactics instead.

Nevertheless, the TNI and its allies continued to conduct guerilla operations from the hills in Dutch-controlled territory. The Dutch retaliated with air strikes and a blockade of Republican-held areas. However, the Dutch were held back from full conquest of the Republic because of pressure from the UN Security Council, and by the United States, who were calling for a ceasefire.

Aftermath
Despite the government of the State of East Indonesia expressing support for the Dutch action, international pressure led to a ceasefire in January 1948 followed by a formal armistice. As a consequence, what was previously considered to be an internal Dutch affair now took on an international dimension. The Renville Agreement, as the armistice was called, stipulated the withdrawal of Indonesian forces from Dutch-occupied territory and the establishment of a ceasefire boundary known as the Van Mook Line. After some time, however, the Indonesian military, secretly, returned and began guerrilla operations against the Dutch. This led, eventually, to the second major Dutch offensive, called Operatie Kraai.

See also
 1947 Yogyakarta Dakota accident

References

Footnotes

Bibliography 

 
 
 
 
 

1947 in Indonesia
1947 in the Dutch East Indies
August 1947 events in Asia
Product
Indonesian National Revolution
Battles of the Indonesian National Revolution
July 1947 events in Asia
Product